Ray Sammons Smith Jr. (February 4, 1924 – November 1, 2007) was an American politician. He was a member of the Arkansas House of Representatives, serving from 1961 to 1992. He was a member of the Democratic party.

References

2007 deaths
1924 births
Politicians from Hot Springs, Arkansas
20th-century American politicians
Speakers of the Arkansas House of Representatives
Democratic Party members of the Arkansas House of Representatives